Diksha Panth is an Indian actress, known for her works predominantly in Telugu cinema. She was selected as a Bigg Boss Telugu contestant through wild card entry and was evicted on the 63rd day. She appeared in Shankarabharanam and Oka Laila Kosam and got her first break in the Telugu movie Gopala Gopala.

Filmography

Television

References

External links
 
 

21st-century Indian actresses
Living people
Actresses in Telugu cinema
Indian film actresses
Actresses from Mumbai
Actresses in Urdu cinema
Actresses in Hindi cinema
Year of birth missing (living people)
Bigg Boss (Telugu TV series) contestants